The following list is a discography of production by Scott Storch, a music producer. It includes a list of songs produced, co-produced and remixed by year, artist, album and title.

Singles produced

1999
"You Got Me" (The Roots featuring Erykah Badu and Eve)
 "Still D.R.E." (Dr. Dre featuring Snoop Dogg)

2000
 "X" (Xzibit featuring Snoop Dogg)
 "Ready 2 Ryde" (Snoop Dogg featuring Eve)

2002
 "Family Portrait" (Pink)
 "Fighter" (Christina Aguilera)
 "The Streets" (WC featuring Snoop Dogg and Nate Dogg)
 "Tarantula" (Mystikal featuring Butch Cassidy)

2003
 "Can't Hold Us Down" (Christina Aguilera featuring Lil' Kim)
 "Baby Boy" (Beyoncé featuring Sean Paul)
 "Clap Back"  (Ja Rule)
 "Poppin' Them Thangs" (G-Unit)
 "Me, Myself And I" (Beyoncé)

2004
 "Naughty Girl" (Beyoncé)
 "Time's Up" (Jadakiss featuring Nate Dogg)
 "Giving It Up For Love'" (Britney Spears)
 "Let Me Love You" (Mario)
 "Lean Back" (Fat Joe featuring Remy Ma)
 "Don't Say Nuthin'" (The Roots)
 "Round and Round'" (Fabolous)

2005
 "U Make Me Wanna" (Jadakiss featuring Mariah Carey)
 "Candy Shop" (50 Cent featuring Olivia)
 "Just a Lil Bit" (50 Cent)
 "Playa's Only" (R. Kelly featuring The Game)
 "Get It Poppin'" (Fat Joe featuring Nelly)
 "Run It!" (Chris Brown featuring Juelz Santana)
 "Turn It Up" (Chamillionaire featuring Lil Flip)
 "Lighters Up" (Lil' Kim)
 "Please" (Toni Braxton)
 "Gangsta Party" (Joe Budden featuring Nate Dogg)
 "Chop Chop" (YoungBloodZ)

2006
 "I'll Hurt You" (Busta Rhymes featuring Eminem)
 "Lord Give Me a Sign" (DMX)
 "Conceited" (Remy Ma)
 "Why We Thugs" (Ice Cube)
 "Gimme That [Remix]" (Chris Brown featuring Lil Wayne)
 "About Us" (Brooke Hogan featuring Paul Wall)
 "Make It Rain" (Fat Joe featuring Lil Wayne)
 "Let's Ride" (The Game)
 "You Ain't Know" (Birdman & Lil Wayne)
 "I Refuse" (Urban Mystic)
 "Turn It Up" (Paris Hilton)

2007
 "Lock U Down" (Mýa featuring Lil Wayne)
 "Impacto" (Daddy Yankee) (Remix featuring Fergie)
 "Magic City"(Neighborhood rapstar)(featuring 2xl, Candy Hill)

2008
 "Work"  (Kelly Rowland) 
 "Comeback"  (Kelly Rowland)-(promotional single)
 "Get Up" (50 Cent)

2009
 "Bingo" (Gucci Mane)

2010
 "Shutterbugg" (Big Boi)
 "Under Pressure" (Dr. Dre featuring Jay-Z)

2011
 "Boom" (Snoop Dogg featuring T-Pain)

2012
 "Where To Find Me" (Saigon featuring Quan)

2015
 "Brick Wall" (TAI & Scott Storch Feat. Hell Yes)
 "Love In The 90z" (Mack Wilds)
Sorry (Rick Ross Feat. Chris Brown)

2016
 "That Love" (Shaggy)
 "All Eyez" (The Game featuring Jeremih)

2017
 "Order Of Operations" (Big Boi) 
 "Drippin'" (Cymphonique) 
 "Think Twice" (Russ) 
 "Prosper" (Russ)
 "Maybe" (Russ)
 "Wife You Up" (Russ)
 "Unhappy" (A Boogie Wit Da Hoodie)
 "Supernova" (Ansel Elgort)
 "TR666" (Trippie Redd and Swae Lee; Re-Release 2020 in album Pegasus)

2018
"Back to Life" (Russ)
"The Flute Song" (Russ)
"My Tata" (Mike11 featuring Jeremih)
"Vraiment Légendaire" (Les Anticipateurs)
"Taking a Walk" (Trippie Redd)
"Wraith" (T.I. featuring Yo Gotti)
"Löwe" (Kollegah)
"KIKA" (6ix9ine featuring Tory Lanez)
"WAKA" (6ix9ine featuring A Boogie Wit Da Hoodie)
"WONDO"  (6ix9ine)
"Down Below"  (Roddy Ricch) 
"Attention"(Fat Joe)
"The Big Pescado" (Berner)

2019
"Undecided" (Chris Brown)
"Zorra" (Bad Gyal)

2020
"Fuego Del Calor" (Scott Storch featuring Ozuna & Tyga)
"Do It" (Chloe x Halle)
"Girls in the Hood" 
"King James" (R-Mean, Jeremih, Scott Storch)
"Dirty Dancer" (Phi11a, Co-produced by Scott Storch)
"Tyler Herro" (Jack Harlow)
"FEEL SOMETHING" (The Kid LAROI featuring Marshmello)
"Not So Different" 
(Parapariparo by Stanley Enow)

Production credits

1993
The Roots – Organix
07. "Grits" (produced with Questlove & The Roots)
09. "I'm Out Deah" (produced with Questlove & The Roots)
17. "Carryin' on" (produced with Questlove & The Roots)

1994
The Roots – Do You Want More?!!!??!
02. "Proceed" (produced with Questlove & The Roots)
04. "Mellow My Man" (produced with Questlove & The Roots)
11. "Essaywhuman?!!!??!" (produced with Questlove & The Roots)

1996
The Roots – Illadelph Halflife
18. "One Shine" (produced with The Grand Negaz)

1999
The Roots – Things Fall Apart
08. "Ain't Sayin' Nothin' New" (produced with The Grand Negaz)
13. "Adrenaline!" (produced with The Grand Negaz)

Rahzel – Make The Music 2000
05. "Carbon Copy (I Can't Stop)"

The Roots – The Best Man: Music From The Motion
01. "What You Want" (produced with The Grand Negaz)

Jazzyfatnastees – The Once And Future
01. "The Wound"
02. "How Sad"
03. "Breakthrough"
04. "Unconventional Ways"
05. "Hear Me"
07. "Related To Me"
09. "Why"
10. "Let It Go"

The Roots – Music From And Inspired By The Motion Picture The Wood
03. "Ya' All Know Who!" (produced with The Roots)

2000
Dice Raw – Reclaiming The Dead
10. "If U Want It"
11. "Forget What They Say"

The Roots –
00. Glitches (The Skin You're In) (feat. Amel Larrieux)

DJ Clue – Backstage The Mixtape
16. Capone 'N Noreaga – Don't Want Beef

Busta Rhymes – Anarchy
05. "Bladow!!"

Nas – Nas & Ill Will Records Presents QB's Finest
08. "Our Way"

Snoop Dogg – Tha Last Meal
13. "Brake Fluid (Biiitch Pump Yo Brakes) (feat. Kokane)"
14. "Ready 2 Ryde (feat. Eve)"
19. "Y'all Gone Miss Me (feat. Kokane)"

2001

City High – City High
07. "Caramel"

Eve – Scorpion
04 "Let Me Blow Ya Mind (feat. Gwen Stefani)" (produced with Dr. Dre)
10 "That's What It Is  (feat. Styles P)" (produced with Dr. Dre)

Mobb Deep – Infamy
10. "Live Foul"
13. "I Won't Fall"
16. "There I Go Again"

Violator The Album V2.0
12. Prodigy of Mobb Deep – "Livin' The Life" (feat. Jadakiss & Butch Cassidy)
17. Rah Digga – "Can't Get Enough" (feat. Meka & Spliff Starr)

Method Man and Redman – How High Soundtrack
07. "Let's Do It"

Mystikal – Tarantula
02. "Tarantula" (feat. Butch Cassidy)
09. "Alright"

2002
Angie Martinez – Animal House
02. "A New Day"

Rock – Walk Like A G
00. "Walk Like A G (feat. Nate Dogg)"

Jazzyfatnastees – The Tortoise & The Hare
06. "Compelled" (produced with Ben Kenney, Richard Nichols and Tracey Moore)
07. "Tumbling" (produced with Mercedes Martinez and Richard Nichols)

Mos Def – Brown Sugar (OST)
01. "Brown Sugar (Extra Sweet Remix feat. Faith Evans)"

Justin Timberlake – Justified
07. "Cry Me A River" (produced by Timbaland)
10. "(And She Said) Take Me Now (feat. Janet Jackson)" (produced by Timbaland, co-produced by Scott Storch)

Pink – Missundaztood
07. "Family Portrait"

Boyz II Men – Full Circle
08. "Roll With Me"

Slum Village – Trinity (Past, Present and Future)
20. Get Live

The Roots – Phrenology
12. Pussy Galore (Produced by Scott Storch & Zoukhan Bey)

Ras Kass – Goldyn Chyld
08. "FucQup"

Christina Aguilera – Stripped
02. "Can't Hold Us Down (feat. Lil' Kim)"
03. "Walk Away"
04. "Fighter"
05. "Primer Amor (Interlude)"
06. "Infatuation"
08. "Loving Me For Me"
10. "Underappreciated"
20. "Keep On Singing My Song"

Onyx – Bacdafucup Part II
12. Wet The Club

WC – Ghetto Heisman
03. "The Streets (feat. Nate Dogg and Snoop Dogg)"

Jaguar Wright – Denials Delusions And Decisions
01. "The What If's"
04. "Love Need And Want You"
06. "Ain't Nobody Playin'"
09. "2 Too Many"

2003
Dina Rae – "The Dina Rae Show"
12. "Can't Even C It"

Angie Martinez – A New Day
02. "A New Day"

Lil' Kim – La Bella Mafia
10. "(When Kim Say) Can You Hear Me Now (feat. Missy Elliott)"
11. "Thug Luv (feat. Twista)"

Britney Spears – In The Zone
00. "Me Against The Music (Scott Storch Remix) (feat. Madonna)"

Ginuwine – The Senior
9.  "Locked Down"
11. "Sex (feat. Solé)"
12. "Bedda Man"

Sticky Fingaz – Decade "...but wait it gets worse"
4.  "Can't Call It"
5. "Hot Now"
12. "Do Da Dam Thing (feat. E.S.T. and X1)"

K Young – K Young
3. "U R So Bad (feat. Crooked I)"

Beyoncé – Dangerously in Love
02. "Naughty Girl"
03. "Baby Boy (feat. Sean Paul)"
05. "Me, Myself and I"

Sarai – The Original
02. "I Know"
09. "You Could Never"
10. "L.I.F.E."
13. "Black & White"

Nelly – Da Derrty Versions: The Reinvention
13. "Work It (Scott Storch Remix feat. Justin Timberlake)"

Ja Rule – Blood In My Eye
03. "Clap Back" (Co-produced by Irv Gotti)

Dream – Reality
04. "Crazy" (feat. Loon)

Loon – Loon
17. "U Don't Know"

G-Unit – Beg For Mercy
02. "Poppin' Them Thangs" (Produced with Dr. Dre)

Memphis Bleek – M.A.D.E.
05. "We Ballin' (feat. Young Chris & Livin Proof)"
11. "Murda Murda (feat. Jay-Z & Beanie Sigel)"

Vivian Green – A Love Story
00. "Fanatic (Scott Storch Remix)"

Nate Dogg – Nate Dogg unreleased
06. "Hide It (feat. Armed Robbery)"

Sly Boogy
00. "That'z My Name"

2004
Young Gunz – Tough Luv
06. "Never Take Me Alive (feat. Jay-Z)"

Janet Jackson – Damita Jo
09. "Island Life" (Produced with Janet Jackson and Jimmy Jam and Terry Lewis)

Jadakiss – Kiss Of Death
05. "Time's Up (feat. Nate Dogg)"
07. "U Make Me Wanna (feat. Mariah Carey)"

Terror Squad – True Story
04. "Lean Back"

The Roots – The Tipping Point
03. "Don't Say Nuthin'"
09. "Duck Down!"

The Roots – Okayplayer – True Notes Vol. 1
10. "Y'all Know Who" (Produced with The Roots)

Fabolous – Real Talk
15. "Round & Round"
17. "Ghetto (feat. Thara)"

Destiny's Child – Destiny Fulfilled
15. "2 Step" (International Bonus Track)
"Heart"

Dina Rae – Track 13 Girl is Dead!...Introducing Dina Rae
"And?"
"Can't Even C It"

Mario – Turning Point
02. "Let Me Love You"
03. "Couldn't Say No"
07. "Call the Cops"
13. "Let Me Love You (Remix feat. T.I. and Jadakiss)"

Trick Daddy – Thug Matrimony: Married to the Streets
14. "I Cry (feat. Ron Isley)"

Petey Pablo – Still Writing in My Diary: 2nd Entry
08. "Get On Dis Motorcycle (feat. Bubba Sparxxx)" (Produced with Timbaland)

Knoc-turn'al – The Way I Am
04. "The Way I Am" (feat. Snoop Dogg)

2Pac – Loyal to the Game
14. "Po Nigga Blues" (Remix)

Raven-Symoné – This Is My Time
02. "Backflip"

T.I. – Urban Legend
10. "Get Ya Shit Together (feat. Lil' Kim)"
15. "Chillin' With My Bitch (feat. Jazze Pha)"

2005
Ruff Ryders – The Redemption Vol. 4
10. "Get Wild" (feat. DMX, Jadakiss, Kartoon & Flashy)"

The Notorious B.I.G. – Duets: The Final Chapter
16. "Ultimate Rush (feat. Missy Elliott)"

Do or Die – D.O.D.
05. "U Already Know (feat. Remy Ma)"

Destiny's Child – Destiny Fulfilled
15. "Cater 2 U (Storch Remix Edit)"
00. "Heart" (Unreleased)
00. "Twirk" (Unreleased)
00. "Body Rock" (Unreleased)
The Game – The Documentary
02. "Westside Story (feat. 50 Cent)" (Produced with Dr. Dre)
10. "Start From Scratch" (Produced with Dr. Dre)

Knoc-Turn'Al – The Way I Am
04. "The Way I Am (feat. Snoop Dogg)"

Benzino – Arch Nemesis
04. "Bottles And Up (Thug Da Club)"

50 Cent – The Massacre
07. "Candy Shop (feat. Olivia)"
14. "Just A Lil Bit"
18. "Build You Up (feat. Jamie Foxx)"

Corey Clark – Corey Clark
03. "Out Of Control"

Vivian Green – Vivian
01. "I Wish We Could Go Back"
02. "Mad"

Fat Joe – All Or Nothing
08. "Get It Poppin'" (feat. Nelly)

R. Kelly – TP-3: Reloaded
01. "Playa's Only" (feat. The Game)

Missy Elliott – The Cookbook
05. "Meltdown"

Heather Hunter – Double H: The Unexpected
05. "Don't Stop (feat. E.S.T.)"

Trey Songz – I Gotta Make It
06. "All The Ifs"

Shaggy – Clothes Drop
14. "Don't Ask Her That (feat. Nicole Scherzinger)"

Toni Braxton – Libra
01. "Please"

Mariah Carey – "The Emancipation Of Mimi"
01. "It's Like That (Scott Storch Remix feat. Fat Joe)"

Lil' Kim – The Naked Truth
03. "Lighters Up"

Ricky Martin – Life
02. "I Don't Care" (feat. Amerie & Fat Joe)
09 "This Is Good" (Produced with The Matrix)

Twista – The Day After
04. "Get It How You Live"

2XL – The Development
20. "31 Flavas"

Chris Brown – Chris Brown
02. "Run It! (feat. Juelz Santana)"
05. "Gimme That (feat. Lil' Wayne)"

Chamillionaire – The Sound Of Revenge
03. Turn It Up (feat. Lil' Flip)"

Jessica Simpson – The Dukes of Hazzard (OST)
12. "These Boots Are Made For Walking (Scott Storch Remix)"

YoungBloodz – Ev'rybody Know Me
02. "Chop Chop"

2006
Remy Ma – There's Something about Remy: Based on a True Story
07. "Conceited (There's Something About Remy)"

Jaheim – Ghetto Classics
04. "Forgetful"

Juvenile – Reality Check
04. Sets Go Up (feat. Wacko)
19. Say It To Me Now (feat. Kango of Partners-N-Crime)

Lil Flip – I Need Mine
Disc Two
07. "Tell Me" (feat. Collie Buddz)

LL Cool J – Todd Smith
09. Ooh Wee (feat. Ginuwine)

Yo Gotti – Back 2 Da Basics
09. "That's What They Made It Foe' (feat. Pooh Bear)"

Ice Cube – Laugh Now, Cry Later
02. Why We Thugs
17. Steal The Show

MC Hammer – Look Look Look
04. "HammerTime (feat. Nox)"
05. "Doing da Thizz"
06. "Look Look Look"

Jurassic 5 – Feedback
03. "Brown Girl (feat. Brick and Lace)"

LeToya – LeToya
12. "I'm Good"
(and the remix featuring Ebony Eyez)

DMX – Year of the Dog...Again
09. Give 'Em What They Want
15. Lord Give Me A Sign

Glasses Malone – Madden NFL 07 Soundtrack
00. Right Now

Paris Hilton – Paris
01. "Turn It Up"
02. "Fighting Over Me" (feat. Fat Joe and Jadakiss)
05. "Jealousy"
06. "Heartbeat"
08. "Screwed"
10. "Turn You On"
11. "Do You Think I'm Sexy"

Danity Kane – Danity Kane
15. "Sleep On It"

Kelis – Kelis Was Here
08. "Trilogy"

Beenie Man – Undisputed
05. "Dutty Wine Gal (feat. Brooke Valentine)"
06. "Jamaican Ting"

Method Man – 4:21...The Day After
02. "Is It Me"

Jessica Simpson – A Public Affair
12. "Fired Up"

Governor – Son of Pain
05. Destiny

Daz Dillinger – So So Gangsta
07. Money on My Mind (feat. Kurupt)

Ludacris – Release Therapy
15. "We Ain't Worried 'Bout U" (iTunes Bonus Track)

Mario Vazquez – Mario Vazquez
03. "Cohiba (feat. Fat Joe & Nox)"

JoJo – The High Road
01. "This Time"

Ruben Studdard – The Return
07. "What Tha Business"

Brooke Hogan – Undiscovered
01. "About Us (feat. Paul Wall)"
02. "Heaven Baby  (feat. Beenie Man)"
03. "Next Time"
04. "For a Moment"
05. "My Space"
06. "All About Me"
07. "My Number (feat. Stacks)"
09. "One Sided"
10. "Letting Go"
11. "Dance Alone (feat. Nox)"
12. "Beautiful Transformation"

Birdman & Lil Wayne – Like Father, Like Son
06. "You Ain't Know"

Fat Joe – Me, Myself & I
07. "Make It Rain" feat. Lil' Wayne
09. "Think About It"

The Game – Doctor's Advocate
06. "Let's Ride"
07. "Too Much" (feat. Nate Dogg)

Tyrese aka Black Ty – Alter Ego
04. "Get It In (feat. Method Man)"

Nas – Hip Hop Is Dead
03. "Carry on Tradition"
13. "Play on Playa" (feat. Snoop Dogg)

Styles P – Time Is Money (Styles P. album)
04. "Real Shit (feat. Gerald Levert)"

Q (of 112) –  Unreleased
00. "Heart In 2"

Urban Mystic – Ghetto Revelations II 
04. "Can U Handle It?" (feat. Pitbull)
05. "Bounce Wit' Me" (feat. Stack$)
06. "I Refuse"
07. "Your Portrait"

2007
2XL – Neighborhood Rapstar
08. "Magic City" feat. Cherish

Benzino – The Antidote
15. "Zexxy"

Bishop Lamont – Pope Mobile
09. "All I Dream About" (feat. Pooh Bear)
10. "Sumthin'"
13. "Music Shit"
14. "Sometimez" (feat. Mike Ant & Chevy Jones)
Chris Brown – Exclusive
15. "Nice" (feat. The Game)

Déja
"Body Ody"

DJ Cynik – Anything But
02. "Get In Get Out"

Jill Scott – The Real Thing: Words and Sounds Vol. 3
06. "Epiphany"

Kelly Rowland – Ms. Kelly
02. "Comeback"
04. "Work (Put It in)"

Keyshia Cole – Just like You
04. "Give Me More"

Mýa – Liberation
04. "Still A Woman"
06. "Lock U Down" (feat. Lil Wayne)

Trey Songz
00. "Make U A Star" (snippet)

The Mossie
03. Hustlinaire (Feat. Jay Tee)
Luc Duc – Amerikkkan Addiction
03. PG-21

Papoose
00. Fitted Hat Low
17. Bang It Out (feat. Snoop Dogg)

Daddy Yankee – El Cartel: The Big Boss
05. "Impacto"
07. "A Lo Clasico"
13. "Que Paso!"
21. "Impacto (Remix)" feat. Fergie

2008
Bishop Lamont
"Do It"
"The Truth" (feat. Stacee Adams)
"Up & Down" (feat. Chevy Jones)
"Right"

Re-Up Gang
"Fast Life"

Fat Joe – The Elephant in the Room
10. "Preacher On a Sunday Morning" (feat. Pooh Bear)

Mariah Carey – E=MC²
12. "Side Effects" (feat. Young Jeezy)

Charli Baltimore
"Lose It"
"P.S."

Bun B – II Trill
"I Luv That"

Lil Mama – VYP: Voice of the Young People
18. "Pick it Up

 Ali Vegas
"That's Nothing"

Fatz
"Stop Hatin" (feat. Hawk)

KeAnthony – A Hustlaz Story
01." Down Girl"

Gucci Mane
"Going To Miami"

Game – L.A.X.
" Let Us Live" (feat. Chrisette Michele)

50 Cent – No album song
03." Get Up"

Ludacris – Theater of the Mind
10. "Contagious" (feat. Jamie Foxx)

Eva
"Fashion Show"
"Slow Down"(feat. Lupe Fiasco)
"Catch Me Later"

LeJit
"We Family"(feat. Mos Def)

T.I.
"A Better Day"

Young Buck
"I'm Out Here "

Holly Rae
"Make It Back"
"Body Language"

04. "That's The Way" (feat. Fat Joe & Trina)
05. "I'm Addicted"
06. "Git It, Git It" (feat. Twista)
07. "Crazee & Confuzed"
08. "Bulletproof" (feat. Beenie Man)

Yankee G
"We Can Roll"
"I Can Feel That" (feat. Nox)

Nox
"So In Love" (feat. Na'sha)
"Reload"
"Block Boy" (feat. Raheem DeVaughn)
"Big NOX" (feat. Missy Elliott)
"Ballas Life" (feat. Tyrese)

Raheem DeVaughn – Love Behind the Melody
03."Love Drug"
"Energy" (feat. Big Boi)

Pooh Bear
"Serious"

Snoop Dogg
"Birthday" (feat. Pooh Bear)

Nikki Valentine
"Crush"
"Gone Away"

Vybe
"Handle That"

Propheta
"Zero Drama" (feat. El Chobbi)

2009
Melanie B – Reimagined
"Whose Is It"

The Game
"Enemy" (feat. Wyclef Jean & Damian Marley)
"Go Ahead" (feat. Ludacris)

Reed Dollaz – And Then Came Reed
01. "Solution"
11. "Party Party"

Montana Tucker
"Work"
"She Can't Dance Like Me" (feat. Tyga)

Knoc-Turn'al
"Ya Boy Is Back"

Bayje
"Heavy Rotation"

Breje
"Glad We Met" (feat. Nyla)

Dena Deadly
"Goodbye"

Eva
"Catch Me Later"
"Fashion Show"
"Slow Down" (feat. Lupe Fiasco)

Dirt Bomb – Born Sinner
"Born Sinner"

Mams Taylor – King Amongst Man (The Lost Album)
"Girl Like This" (feat. Rico Love)
"London Lingo"

Gucci Mane – The State vs. Radric Davis
"Bingo" (feat. Soulja Boy Tell 'Em & Waka Flocka Flame)

Matthew Loverso
"I.O.U." (feat. Gabriel Bello)

Nu Jerzey Devil
"Lost 4 Words" (feat. Ne-Yo)
"That's Me" (feat. Urban Mystic)

Ne-Yo
"Winner"

Snoop Dogg
"Let It Rain"

C-Ride
"Real Nigga 24" (feat. Rick Ross)

Majic Massey
" Girl I Want"

Chali 2na – Fish Outta Water
" Love's Gonna Getcha"

Robin Thicke – Sex Therapy
" Dirty It Up"

Chris Brown
"Don't Know What It Is"
"Brown Skin Girl" (feat. Sean Paul)

Phyllisia
" Sunshine" (feat. Ne-Yo & Flo Rida)

San-T
"Malinfolmao"

Johnta Austin
" Ghetto Girl"

Ya Boy – The Facelift
"Life Is a Movie"

N.O.R.E. – S.O.R.E.
" My Girl Gangsta (feat. T-Pain)

Frankie Goes to Hollywood
"Relax (Scott Storch Mix)"

Mike Epps
"The Bitch Won't Leave Me Alone"
"Trying To Be A Gangsta" (feat. Pooh Bear)

Quietus Khan – Patience
"It's Alright"
"The Beat"
"The Good Part"
"The South"

Nipsey Hussle
"Good For Me"

Novel
"Tidal Wave"

Nox
"Get Low"
"Taboo"

Andre Boykins
"Your Girl"
"My Voice"

Frank Lee White
"G.A."

Bone Thugs-N-Harmony
"Nuff Respect"

The Game
"Breakin' Rules" (feat. Busta Rhymes)
"Gangster"

Baby Bash
"Million Dollar Mexican"

2010
Ace Mac
"Believe It"
"Money Right Feat. Magic"

Brooke Hogan
"Slide Show"

Game
"Jump Off" (feat. Ja Rule)

Nox
"Get It On"

R. Kelly
"I Believe (Remix)"

Big Boi
"Shutterbugg"

Mýa
"I'm Not Done'"

DoItAll
"We're a Different Kind" (feat. Keish Shontelle & Mike Biv)

Chali 2na
"Step Yo Game Up"

Lipps
"I'm on Top"

Ray L
"Drop Wat I'm Doing"

Drake
"One Man Show"

Pooh Bear
"Never Part"

Monica Nicole
"Dance with Me" (Amerie Demo)

Majic Massey
"Show It Off"

2011
Snoop Dogg – Doggumentary
09. "Boom" (featuring T-Pain)
"Player (feat. Flo Rida)"

2013
Mike Stud 
00. "Dreamin'"

"Getaway'" (feat. Nelly Furtado)

Meek Mill – Dreamchasers 3
11. "Fuckin Wit Me" (feat. Tory Lanez)

Vado – Sinatra
"Look Me In My Eyes" (feat. Rick Ross & French Montana)

2014
Rick Ross – Mastermind
10. "Supreme"

Snoop Dogg – That's My Work, Part 3
19. "Happy Birthday Pt. 2" (feat. Poo Bear)

Uncle Murda & GMG – Aint Nothing Sweet
"Rollin"

Chris Webby – Chemically Imbalanced (Chris Webby Album)
03 "Set It Off"
10 "Chemically Imbalanced"

Erika Jayne
"Crazy" (feat. Maino)

2015
Subliminal
 "Get Money" (feat. Timati)

Chris Brown & Tyga – Fan of a Fan: The Album
 13. "Wrong In the Right Way"

Mario – Never 2 Late
02. "It's A Crime"
03. "Forever" (feat. Rick Ross)
04. "Sink Or Swim"
05. "Show You Off"
06. "Vegas"
07. "Saturday Night"
08. "Enemy"
09. "Never However"
10. "Forever"
12. "Favorite"
13. "Birthday"
14. "Beautiful Angel"
15. "Never Surrender"

Rick Ross – Black Market
13. "Sorry" (feat. Chris Brown)

DJ Khaled – I Changed a Lot
08. "Every Time We Come Around" (feat. French Montana, Jadakiss, Ace Hood & Vado) (produced with The Mekanics)

Chris Brown – Royalty International – EP
02. "Shattered"

2016
PnB Rock & Fetty Wap – Money, Hoes, and Flows
06. "Hood Rich"

2017
Big Boi – Boomiverse
05. "Order of Operations"

Young Thug – Beautiful Thugger Girls
04. "Daddy's Birthday" (produced with London on da Track)

 Bone Thugs-N-Harmony – New Waves
07. "Waves" (feat. Layzie Bone, Wish Bone & Flesh-n-Bone)

French Montana – Jungle Rules
12. "Stop It" (feat. T.I.) (produced with Diego Ave)

Stevie Stone – Level Up
02. "Whippin' Up" (feat. DB Bantino) (produced with Diego Ave)
04. "Crushin'" (feat. DB Bantino) (produced with Diego Ave)

A Boogie wit da Hoodie – The Bigger Artist
06. "Unhappy" (produced with Diego Ave)

Blac Youngsta – 2:23
8. "Right There" (feat. French Montana) (produced with Murda Beatz)
13. "Drop Yo Flag" 
 Chris Brown – Heartbreak on a Full Moon
Disc Two
13. "Enemy" (produced with Diego Ave)
Casanova – Commissary
07. "Left Right" (featuring Chris Brown and Fabolous)

2018
Berner – The Big Pescado
Full album
Maluma – F.A.M.E.
07. How I Like It
Post Malone – Beerbongs & Bentleys
04. "Zack & Codeine"
Trippie Redd – Life's a Trip
02. "Taking A Walk"
Russ – Zoo
01. The Flute Song
T.I. – Dime Trap
03. Wraith (ft. Yo Gotti)
Yella Beezy – Ain't No Goin' Bacc
19. Play Yo Part
6ix9ine – Dummy Boy
04. KIKA (ft. Tory Lanez)
06. WAKA (ft. A Boogie Wit Da Hoodie)
12. WONDO
Kollegah – Monument
09. Löwe

2019
KILLY – Light Path 8
04. "Eye for an Eye" (produced with Avedon)

Chris Brown – Indigo
01. "Indigo"
05. "Emerald" (featuring Juicy J and Juvenile)
20. "Undecided"
28. "Early 2k" (featuring Tank)

Phora – Bury Me With Dead Roses
05. "Blame On Me"

Blueface – Dirt Bag
05. "Bussin" (featuring Lil Pump)

Summer Walker – Over It
14. "Anna Mae" 
15. "I'll Kill You" (featuring Jhené Aiko)

Berner – La Plaza
07. "Going Out Like That" (featuring Fat Joe and De La Ghetto)

2020
Russ – Shake the Snow Globe
01. "3am" (featuring Ty Dolla Sign) (Deluxe)

Chloe x Halle – Ungodly Hour
04. "Do It"
10. "Lonely"

Tee Grizzley – The Smartest
08. "Picture of My City"
"I Spy"(singles)

The Lox – Living Off Xperience
02. "Move" (produced with Avedon)
07. "Do to Me" (featuring Jeremih) (produced with The Rascals)

Aluna – Renaissance
13. "Surrender"

Luh Kel – L.O.V.E.
03. "Real"

Trippie Redd – Pegasus
25. "TR666" (featuring Swae Lee) (produced with Avedon)

Ariana Grande – Positions
08. "My Hair" (produced with Tommy Brown, Anthony M. Jones and Charles Anderson)

Dave East – Karma 3
17. "One in the Sky" (Deluxe)

Ayanis – YANI
02. "That's Real" (featuring A Boogie wit da Hoodie)

The Kid Laroi – F ck Love (Savage)
16. "Feel Something" (featuring Marshmello)

Megan Thee Stallion – Good News
16. "Girls in the Hood"

Jack Harlow – Thats What They All Say
11. "Tyler Herro" (produced with Boi-1da)

2021
Ai – It's All Me, Vol. 2
01. "Not So Different"
06. "Not So Different" (Remix featuring Awich

Bad Gyal – Warm Up
08. "Zorra (remix)" (Bad Gyal featuring Rauw Alejandro)

2022
The Isley Brothers – Make Me Say It Again, Girl
07. "Last Time"
12. "Right Way"
Stanley Enow - "Parapariparo"

Other contributions

1994
Spearhead – Home
01. "People In Tha Middle" (keyboards)
05. "Of Course You Can" (drums & percussion)
10. "Crime To Be Broke In America" (fender rhodes)

G. Love & Special Sauce – G. Love and Special Sauce
Entire Album – Scott Storch in Piano

Boogiemonsters – Riders of the Storm: The Underwater Album
03. "Boogie" (additional keyboards)
11. "Salt Water Taffy" (additional keyboards)

2001
D12 – Devil's Night
06. "Ain't Nothing But Music" (keyboards)
11. "Fight Music" (keyboards)
18. "Revelation" (keyboards)

Eve – Scorpion
10. "That's What It Is" (keyboards)

Busta Rhymes – Genesis
08. "Truck Volume" (keyboards)
10. "Break Ya Neck" (keyboards)

Mack 10  – Bang or Ball
02. "Hate In Yo Eyes" (keyboards)

Nelly Furtado  – Whoa, Nelly!
02. "Turn off the Light (Timbaland Remix feat. Ms. Jade)" (keyboards)

Bubba Sparxxx  – Dark Days, Bright Nights
04. "Bubba Talk" (keyboards)
05. "Lovely" (keyboards)
08. "Get Right" (keyboards)
15. "Bubba Sparxxx" (clavinet)

2002
Justin Timberlake – Justified
05. "Cry Me A River" (clavinet)

Ms. Jade – Girl Interrupted
03. "She's A Gangsta" (keyboards)
13. "Feel The Girl" (keyboards)

2003
Kiley Dean – Simple Girl
03. "Make Me A Song" (keyboards)

G-Unit – Beg For Mercy
15. "G'D Up" (keyboards)

50 Cent – The New Breed
03. "In Da Hood (feat. Brooklyn)" (piano)

2006
Stacee Adamz- My Backyard Volume 1
00. "Major Leagues"
00. "Last Call" (feat. The Game)
00."Pimp Hand"
00. "Stay Ballin"
00. "Headz up" (feat. Truth Hurts)

Crooked I
00. "Cali Boyz"

Danity Kane
00. "Sleep on It"

Sly Boogy
00. " It's Nuthin"

Frank Lee White – Unreleased
00. "Ride Out"

Jae Millz – Back to the Future
00. My Swag

Styles P – Ghost In The Machine
00. "Pop The Clutch"
00. "Day You Die (feat. Sheek Louch)"

Urban Mystic – Ghetto Revelations II
00. "You Can Handle This (feat. Pitbull)"
05. "Bounce With Me (feat. Stacks)"
06. "I Refuse"
07. "Your Portrait"

Zeebra – The New Beginning
11. "The Motto" (feat. OJ Flow and UZI)

Chamillionaire – The Sound of Revenge
00. "Turn It Up"

 Chingy
00. "What's It Like"

Chris Brown – Chris Brown
00. "Run It!"
00. "Gimme That"

Christina Aguilera – Stripped
00. "Can't Hold Us Down"
00. "Fighter"

N.O.R.E. – 1 Fan a Day (Unreleased)
13. "Do Somethin'"*

Hawk – Unknown Album
00. "Wild Out*
00. "Relax" (Ft Ne-Yo)*
00. "Hoes Ain't Shit" (Ft Lil' Jon)*
00. "Lets Go"
00. "Heavy Weights"

Nox  – Unknown Album
00. "This What It Sound Like (Ft Redman)*
00. "In Da Streetz (Ft Proof)*

(& Others)

Nomb – Unknown Album
00. "Get Loose"

Paris Hilton – Paris
02. "Fightin' Over Me"
05. "Jealousy"
06. "Heartbeat"
10. "Turn You On"
01. "Turn It Up"

Silena Murrell – From Da Street To Da Stage
00. "Bring It Home"
00. "I Like My Man Hard"
00. "Shorty How U Like That"

Knoc-Turn'Al – Unknown Album
00. "Rock The Party"

Yung Killa – Unknown Album
00. "Middle Finga"

2007
Papoose
 Bang It Out feat. Snoop Dogg
 Fitted Hat Low

Timati
00 Get Money feat. Nox
00 Put U Take It feat. Fat Joe & Nox
FreeMe G

00 Gangsta, gangsta produced by Scott Storch

Candi Pye – Unknown Album
00. "Get Money" Ft Yung Joc

Nox
00. "Spend Money featuring Jim Jones"
00. "My Zone Featuring Yung Joc"
00. "Ballas Life featuring Tyrese"

Smitty
00. "Died In Your Arms"
00. "Died In Your Arms (Remix)" featuring T-Pain, Junior Reid and Rick Ross

Chris DeShield
00. "Beat In The Back"

Merj
00. "I Ain't Mad At Ya" featuring Frank Lee White

D-Block
00. "She Want" featuring Fat Joe and Joell Ortiz

Chevy P (Of Field Mob)
00. So Lonely

KeAnthony – A Hustlaz Story
00. Down Girl

T.I.
"A Better Day"

2008
Clipse Presents: Re-Up Gang
04. "Fast Life"

Nox
"Block Boy" (feat. Raheem DeVaughn)

2009
50 Cent
03. "Get Up"

Mario
"Step Out"
"Apple Bottom"
"Jeanz"

References

Discographies of American artists
Production discographies
Hip hop discographies
Pop music discographies